Otostigmus ceylanicus is a species of centipedes in the family Scolopendridae. It is known only from Sri Lanka.

References

ceylanicus
Animals described in 1909
Endemic fauna of Sri Lanka